Histerini is a tribe of clown beetles in the family Histeridae. There are at least 540 described species in Histerini.

See also
 List of Histerinae genera

References

 Mazur, Slawomir (1997). "A world catalogue of the Histeridae (Coleoptera: Histeroidea)". Genus, International Journal of Invertebrate Taxonomy (Supplement), 373.

Further reading

 NCBI Taxonomy Browser, Histerini
 Arnett, R. H. Jr., M. C. Thomas, P. E. Skelley and J. H. Frank. (eds.). (21 June 2002). American Beetles, Volume II: Polyphaga: Scarabaeoidea through Curculionoidea. CRC Press LLC, Boca Raton, Florida .
 
 Richard E. White. (1983). Peterson Field Guides: Beetles. Houghton Mifflin Company.

Histeridae
Polyphaga tribes